Hélder Manuel Elias Domingos Baptista (born 18 February 1972) is a Portuguese retired professional footballer who played as a defensive midfielder.

He amassed Primeira Liga totals of 166 matches and six goals over seven seasons, mainly with Boavista. He also spent several years in Spain, with Rayo Vallecano.

After retiring, Baptista went on to work as an assistant manager.

Playing career

Club
Born in Torres Vedras, Lisbon District, Baptista made his senior – and Primeira Liga – debut in the 1991–92 season, appearing sparingly as local club S.C.U. Torreense was relegated after finishing third bottom. In the following six years, with the exception of 1993–94, spent with the same team, he continued to compete in the top flight, representing S.C. Farense, S.C. Braga and Boavista FC; he played his first game in the UEFA Cup with the latter side, featuring the full 90 minutes in a 3–2 away win against Odense Boldklub on 10 September 1996.

In January 1999, Baptista signed with Paris Saint-Germain F.C. in the Ligue 1, but the following transfer window he switched to the Spanish La Liga with Rayo Vallecano, his first match in the latter competition taking place on 22 August when he came as a 73rd-minute substitute for Luis Cembranos in the 2–0 victory at Atlético Madrid, and his maiden goal occurring on 5 December in a 3–2 away loss to Deportivo de La Coruña.

Baptista contributed nine appearances (eight starts) in Rayo's quarter-final run in the 2000–01 UEFA Cup, but from 2002 to 2004 he also saw the club drop two consecutive levels. He retired in 2006 at the age of 33, after one year in the Portuguese third tier with Torreense.

International
Baptista earned six caps for Portugal at under-21 level in one year. His last appearance was a 2–1 win over Scotland in the 1994 UEFA European Championship qualifiers on 27 April 1993, where he played as a substitute.

Coaching career
Baptista started working as a coach in 2011, joining Pedro Caixinha's staff at U.D. Leiria. He continued to work under the latter in the following years, at C.D. Nacional, Mexico's Santos Laguna and Al-Gharafa SC from Qatar.

In March 2017, both Caixinha and Baptista joined Scottish club Rangers. On 26 October, they left.

References

External links

1972 births
Living people
People from Torres Vedras
Sportspeople from Lisbon District
Portuguese footballers
Association football midfielders
Primeira Liga players
Liga Portugal 2 players
Segunda Divisão players
S.C.U. Torreense players
S.C. Farense players
S.C. Braga players
Boavista F.C. players
Ligue 1 players
Paris Saint-Germain F.C. players
La Liga players
Segunda División players
Rayo Vallecano players
Portugal under-21 international footballers
Portuguese expatriate footballers
Expatriate footballers in France
Expatriate footballers in Spain
Portuguese expatriate sportspeople in France
Portuguese expatriate sportspeople in Spain
Portuguese expatriate sportspeople in Mexico
Portuguese expatriate sportspeople in Qatar
Portuguese expatriate sportspeople in Scotland
Rangers F.C. non-playing staff